Dryophylax gambotensis is a species of snake in the family Colubridae. The species is endemic to Colombia.

References

Dryophylax
Snakes of South America
Reptiles of Colombia
Endemic fauna of Colombia
Reptiles described in 1989